The 2000–01 QSPHL season was the fifth season of the Quebec Semi-Pro Hockey League, a minor professional league in the Canadian province of Quebec. 14 teams participated in the regular season, and the Mission de Joliette won the league title.

Regular season

Coupe Futura-Playoffs

External links 
 Statistics on hockeydb.com

Ligue Nord-Américaine de Hockey seasons
LNAH